Neita neita, the Neita brown, is a butterfly of the family Nymphalidae. It is found in South Africa in several isolated populations in grassland and grassy savanna covered hillsides from Eastern Cape into KwaZulu-Natal, Swaziland, Mpumalanga, Limpopo and North West.

The wingspan is 45–50 mm for males and 45–58 mm for females. Adults are on wing from October to March (with a peak in December). There is a single extended generation per year.

The larvae probably feed on Poaceae grasses.

References

Butterflies described in 1875
Satyrini
Butterflies of Africa
Taxa named by Hans Daniel Johan Wallengren